Smithville, New Jersey may refer to:
Smithville, Atlantic County, New Jersey
Smithville, Burlington County, New Jersey